Oksana Serikova (also Oxana Serikova, ; born June 11, 1985) is a Ukrainian swimmer, who specialized in sprint freestyle events. She helped out her Ukrainian team to break a national record time of 4:05.56 in the women's medley relay at the 2006 European Aquatics Championships in Budapest, Hungary. She is also an eighth-place finalist in the 50 m freestyle at the 2010 European Aquatics Championships in the same location as four years before.

Serikova qualified as a lone swimmer for Ukraine in the women's 50 m freestyle at the 2008 Summer Olympics in Beijing, by clearing a FINA B-standard entry time of 25.56 from the EDF Swimming Open in Paris, France. Serikova scorched her way to sixth place and thirty-second overall in heat nine of the evening prelims with a time of 25.65, failing to advance further to the semifinals.

References

External links
NBC Olympics Profile

1985 births
Living people
Ukrainian female swimmers
Olympic swimmers of Ukraine
Swimmers at the 2008 Summer Olympics
Ukrainian female freestyle swimmers
Sportspeople from Donetsk Oblast